General Sir Dighton Macnaghten Probyn,  (21 January 1833 – 20 June 1924) was a British Army officer and an English recipient of the Victoria Cross, the highest award for gallantry in the face of the enemy that can be awarded to British and Commonwealth forces.

Early career
The son of Captain George Probyn and Alicia Workman, daughter of Sir Francis Workman Macnaghten, 1st Baronet, Dighton Probyn entered the light cavalry arm of the East India Company's Bengal Army as a cornet in 1849, being posted into the 6th Light Cavalry. In 1852, he was appointed adjutant of the newly raised 2nd Punjab Cavalry which formed part of the 11,000 strong Punjab Irregular Force responsible for policing the Trans-Indus Frontier.

At the time of the outbreak of the Indian Rebellion of 1857, on 10 May 1857, Dighton Probyn was at Jullundur, the station of the 6th Bengal Light Cavalry. Probyn's squadron of the 2nd Punjab Cavalry fought throughout the uprising, with Probyn being 'Mentioned in Despatches' many times for his actions.

By the end of 1857 the squadron of 2nd Punjab Cavalry which Probyn commanded was frequently referred to as Probyn's Horse, as Lieutenant E. H. Verney, RN, records in The Shannon's Brigade in India:

During the final days of the fall of Lucknow in early 1858, the 2nd Punjab Cavalry was constantly engaged in patrolling and was frequently sent short distances in pursuit of fleeing mutineers and rebels. By this time, Probyn, worn down by the rigours of continual campaigning, was invalided back to England on 18 March 1858. By now a captain, he was brevetted to major in the regular army on 24 March 1858. Probyn was brevetted to the rank of lieutenant-colonel in the Bengal Army on 15 February 1861. He was brevetted to colonel on 15 February 1866 and to major-general on 25 July 1870.

Victoria Cross

Probyn was 24 years old, and a captain in the 2nd Punjab Cavalry, Bengal Army during the Indian Mutiny when the following deeds took place for which he was awarded the VC:

His VC sold at auction on 24 September 2005 for £160,000.

Royal courtier
On 4 March 1872, the Prince of Wales, later Edward VII, appointed him as one of his equerries. He was knighted as a Knight Commander of the Order of the Star of India (KCSI) on 7 March 1876, and was brevetted to lieutenant-general on 1 October 1877. He was promoted to the substantive rank of lieutenant-colonel in the Bengal Cavalry on 1 April 1881, and was transferred to the unemployed list on 1 July 1882. He was appointed a Knight Commander of the Order of the Bath, Civil Division (KCB) in the 1887 Golden Jubilee Honours. On 1 December 1888, he was promoted to the local rank of general in the British Indian Army while unemployed, and was promoted to the substantive rank of colonel in the Bengal Cavalry on 1 April 1893. He was appointed one of the first Knights Grand Cross of the Royal Victorian Order (GCVO) on 26 May 1896.

He was a councillor of the Oxford Military College in Cowley, Oxfordshire from 1876 to 1896, and was appointed a member of the Privy Council on 9 February 1901. He was promoted to a Knight Grand Cross of the (civil division) Order of the Bath (GCB) in the 1902 Coronation Honours list published on 26 June 1902, and was invested by King Edward VII at Buckingham Palace on 8 August 1902. He was appointed a Companion of the Imperial Service Order (ISO) on 22 July 1903. He was appointed a Knight Commander of the Order of the Bath, Military Division (KCB (Mil.)) on 20 October 1909.

He was in later life an ornament of the Victorian age, being Keeper of the Privy Purse, a court sinecure position as well as Secretary to the Prince of Wales and Comptroller of the Household. This was an important position as the Prince and Princess were both profligate in spending and Probyn had a hard job to keep them solvent. Testimony to his success was the fact that, when the Prince acceded at last in 1901, he was in credit at the bank.  Probyn had difficulty hiding the King's extravagance, which the minister Charles Hobhouse refused to defend in the Commons.

Probyn continued in this role throughout the King's rule and right up to his death. He was appointed an Extra Equerry to King Edward VII in 1902.

Probyn was totally devoted to the Princess, then Queen-Empress, building gardens for her at Windsor Castle and Sandringham House.  The Queen returned the devotion, carrying round a knife with her to cut open his collar when he occasionally had seizures.

In 1915 Probyn gave an engraved wristwatch to Captain Frank Beck, the officer who led the Sandringham Volunteers in the First World War. After he was killed during the Gallipoli Campaign, it was bought from a Turkish officer after the war and returned to Beck's family in 1922.

Probyn had an impressive appearance in old age with a very long white beard reaching down to his navel which concealed his VC on ceremonial occasions.

Death
Probyn died on 20 June 1924. He was buried in Kensal Green Cemetery in the Royal Borough of Kensington and Chelsea.

Family
Probyn married, in 1872, Letitia Maria Thellusson, daughter of Thomas Robarts Thellusson. Lady Probyn died at Park House, Sandringham, Norfolk, on 17 January 1900.

Legacy
The 5th King Edward's Own Probyn's Horse popularly called Probyn's Horse, a regiment of the British Indian Army, was named after him; it is now part of the Pakistan Army and officially designated as 5 Horse.

Probynabad, a town in Punjab province of Pakistan with large farmlands owned by the regiment is also named after him.

An Iris iberica hybrid was named 'Sir Dighton Probyn' in 1909 by Professor M. Foster.

References

External links

Auction details
Location of grave and VC medal (Kensal Green Cemetery)
Probyn's Horse 
Portrait of Colonel Probyn 1867 by James Rannie Swinton

1833 births
1924 deaths
British Indian Army generals
British East India Company Army officers
Knights Grand Cross of the Order of the Bath
Knights Grand Commander of the Order of the Star of India
Knights Grand Cross of the Royal Victorian Order
Companions of the Imperial Service Order
Indian Rebellion of 1857 recipients of the Victoria Cross
People from Marylebone
British recipients of the Victoria Cross
British military personnel of the Umbeyla Campaign
British military personnel of the Second Opium War
Recipients of the Order of St. Anna
Burials at Kensal Green Cemetery
Members of the Privy Council of the United Kingdom